Sili is a tiny village on the island of Olosega on Ofu-Olosega. Sili, situated on the northwestern-facing shore, in the present day consists of but one standing inhabited residence after much of the village was destroyed by cyclones (and subsequently abandoned). Its closest place is Lalomoana.

It is located in Olosega County.

References

Villages in American Samoa